The Wolves are three rocks just over a mile northwest of the island of Flat Holm in the Bristol Channel. They measure approximately 25 metres by 20 metres and were responsible for the wrecking of at least two ships:

1817 — the William & Mary struck the rocks and sank within minutes. 54 passengers were lost, 50 of whom were recovered and buried on Flat Holm.
1917 — the Swansea Packet, sank with all 60 passengers and crew.

References

Uninhabited islands of Wales
Islands of the Bristol Channel
Shipwrecks of Wales
Islands of Cardiff